Michaela Drummond (born 5 April 1998) is a New Zealand professional track and road racing cyclist, who currently rides for UCI Women's Continental Team . She won bronze medals in the team pursuit at the 2017 UCI Track Cycling World Championships and 2019 UCI Track Cycling World Championships.

Major results

2015 – Under 19
UCI Junior Track World Championships
1st  Team Pursuit
Oceania Track Championships
1st  Omnium
1st  Scratch Race
New Zealand Track Championships
1st  Omnium
1st  Points Race
2016
Oceania Track Championships
1st  Scratch Race
2nd Madison (with Racquel Sheath)
UCI Junior Track World Championships
2nd Omnium
2nd Team Pursuit
New Zealand Track Championships
1st  Omnium
2017
Oceania Track Championships
1st  Team Pursuit
3rd Omnium
New Zealand Track Championships
1st  Omnium
1st  Madison (with Racquel Sheath)
3rd Team pursuit, UCI Track World Championships

References

External links

1998 births
Living people
New Zealand female cyclists
New Zealand track cyclists
People from Te Awamutu
Cyclists at the 2018 Commonwealth Games
Commonwealth Games competitors for New Zealand
Cyclists at the 2022 Commonwealth Games
Commonwealth Games silver medallists for New Zealand
Commonwealth Games medallists in cycling
20th-century New Zealand women
21st-century New Zealand women
Sportspeople from Waikato
Medallists at the 2022 Commonwealth Games